Mahua Plus is a Bhojpuri general entertainment television channel owned and operated by Mahua Broadcasting Private Limited.  The channel's programming consists of entertainment, music, travel, religion, feature films, documentaries, reality television.

History
The channel was launched on 9 August 2008 as Mahua TV and repackaged/ relaunched on 22 February 2017 by MD & CEO Mr Vincent Rogger Peter.

Former shows
Bihane Bihane
Prabhu Ke Dware
Bhojpuriya Dangal
Record Tod
Superhit Lagataar
Entertainment News

Reality shows
SURVEER - Sangeet Ka Mahasangram
Dance Ghamasan
Chal Baliye Sur Chetra Me

See also
List of Bhojpuri-language television channels

References

Television channels and stations established in 2008
Television stations in New Delhi
Bhojpuri-language television
Mass media in Bihar